Parliamentary elections were held in Belarus on 17 November 2019.

Background
Parliamentary elections were required to be held no later than 6 September 2020. However, in his annual address to the nation on 19 April 2019, President Alexander Lukashenko announced that they would be held in 2019. Lukashenko suggested Sunday 7 November or October Revolution Day as possible dates, however the election was ultimately scheduled for 17 November 2019.

Electoral system
The 110 members of the House of Representatives were elected from single-member constituencies by first-past-the-post voting.

Participating parties

Opinion polls

Campaign 
Most opposition parties decided to contest the election but not all candidates were registered. The Conservative Christian Party and the Belarusian Social-Democratic Assembly decided to boycott the elections.

Conduct
On 13 November, during preliminary voting, an observer in Brest published a video showing alleged ballot stuffing. Lidia Yermoshina, chief of the Central Election Commission of Belarus, denied fraud had taken place and stated that the observer's accreditation should be withdrawn as they were not allowed to film in a room with ballot boxes. On 15 November, the observer's accreditation was withdrawn by the local electoral commission. Another objection by the same observer concerning the number of preliminary votes was accepted.

Students from some universities claimed that they had been forced to participate in preliminary voting, or encouraged to do so by being allowed absences from classes on Saturday and Monday. The universities denied the claims. On 15 November Belarusian State Economic University students openly protested near the campus for similar reasons, citing the recently published video with one of their instructors (curators) demanding people participate in the preliminary voting.

Election observers from the Organization for Security and Cooperation in Europe said that “fundamental freedoms were disregarded and the integrity of the election process was not adequately safeguarded". A statement from the OSCE team cited concerns including what they described as the exclusion of many opposition candidates, limited opportunity for public campaigning and shortcomings during vote counting. OSCE observer Margaret Cederfeldt said the election had demonstrated "an overall lack of respect for democratic commitments".

Election observers from the Commonwealth of Independent States described the elections as "competitive, open, free [and] transparent", adding that they considered them to be held in line with the country's Constitution and Electoral Code.

Results
Only 21 of the 110 elected deputies were members of political parties, with all belonging to pro-government parties; the Communist Party of Belarus emerged as the largest party in the House of Representatives with 11 MPs, the Republican Party of Labour and Justice came second with six seats, the Belarusian Patriotic Party won two and the Agrarian Party and Liberal Democratic Party won a seat each.

Unlike in the previous elections in 2016, in which two opposition candidates were elected, the opposition did not win a single seat; the opposition United Civic Party lost its sole seat and the only pro-opposition independent MP failed to be re-elected. All 110 elected representatives were described as "loyal" to President Alexander Lukashenko. For all but one term since 2004, there have been no opposition MPs in the House of Representatives. However, since a 1996 referendum effectively concentrated all governing power in Lukashenko's hands, the House has been dominated by Lukashenko supporters even when opposition MPs have managed to get into the chamber, and the House has done little more than approve Lukashenko's policies.

44 of the 110 elected MPs were women, two were under the age of 30 and thirty were members of the previous parliament.

By oblast

International reaction

In its report following the elections, the OSCE stated that the legal framework in Belarus "does not adequately guarantee the conduct of elections in line with OSCE commitments and other international standards and obligations". As to the voting, the OSCE stated that " the lack of safeguards in election day and early voting procedures negatively impacted the integrity of the process." It also highlighted that "over 1,000 complaints and applications were filed with the election commissions, local authorities and courts, mostly related to appointment of commission members and candidate registration and deregistration".

The US State Department made a statement, referring to the decision by the OSCE: "The Office for Democratic Institutions and Human Rights (ODIHR), the Organization for Security and Cooperation in Europe (OSCE) Parliamentary Assembly, and the Council of Europe's conclusions and observations about these elections are deeply troubling. We regret that alternative voices will not be represented in parliament."

The European Union noted that the election "took place in an overall calm atmosphere" but stated that "there was an overall disregard for fundamental freedoms of assembly, association and expression".

Notes

References

Belarus
Parliament
Belarus
Parliamentary elections in Belarus